Nirnayam is a 1991 Indian Telugu-language action drama film directed by Priyadarshan in his Telugu debut, produced by D. Kishore on Jayabheri Art Productions banner, presented by M.Murali Mohan, starring Nagarjuna, Amala Akkineni  and music composed by Ilaiyaraaja.

The movie was dubbed in Tamil and Hindi languages as Sambavam and Girafthari respectively. This film is a remake of Priyadarshan's own 1989 Malayalam film  Vandanam starring Mohanlal which itself was based on the 1987 movie Stakeout.

Plot
A sincere cop named Vamsi Krishna (Nagarjuna) is sent undercover along with two other cops. Shivram (Subhalekha Sudhakar) is one of those cops and is a close friend and associate to Vamsi. The cops are sent by the Police Commissioner (Giri Babu) to track down a vicious and dangerous criminal named Raghuram (Murali Mohan). Vamsi performs surveillance on Raghuram's daughter Geetha (Amala) by getting into her opposite building's flat in a residential complex to gather details and whereabouts of her criminal father. Geeta lives with her aunt Jolly (Sukumari). When Vamsi, in the guise of a telephone department inspector, pursues Geetha and falls in love with her, she reciprocates his love interest initially but refuses after she gets to know the truth that he is a cop and is about to drag her father to prison. Vamsi gets hold of Raghuram through Geetha and finds out that he is actually an innocent victim. The real criminal, Prahlad (Sharat Saxena), deceives Raghuram and plans a crime operation. The misunderstanding between Geetha and Vamsi gets cleared up, and Vamsi banishes Prahlad.

Cast

Nagarjuna as Inspector Vamsi Krishna
Amala Akkineni as Geetha
Murali Mohan as Raghuram
Sharat Saxena as Prahlad Rao
Subhalekha Sudhakar as Inspector Shivram
Giri Babu as Police Commissioner Narahari
Annapoorna as Vamsi's mother
Sukumari as Jolly, Geetha's aunt
Jyothi as Nalini 
Suthivelu as Yadagiri
Chinni Jayanth
Allu Rama Lingaiah
Charuhasan in a cameo  appearance
Chota K. Naidu
Bhimeswara Rao as Principal 
Prasanna Kumar as Vinod 
Rajeevi as Anarkali 
Potti Veeraiyah 
Husain

Soundtrack

Music composed by Ilaiyaraaja. Music released on ECHO Audio Company.

References

External links
 

1991 films
1990s Telugu-language films
Telugu remakes of Malayalam films
Indian action films
Films directed by Priyadarshan
Films scored by Ilaiyaraaja
1991 action films